The 1954 German Grand Prix was a Formula One motor race held at Nürburgring on 1 August 1954. It was race 6 of 9 in the 1954 World Championship of Drivers. It was the 17th German Grand Prix since the race was first held in 1926 and the 16th to be held at the Nürburgring complex of circuits. The race was won by 1951 world champion, Argentine driver Juan Manuel Fangio driving a Mercedes-Benz W196. Ferrari 625 drivers Mike Hawthorn (in a shared drive with José Froilán González) and Maurice Trintignant finished second and third for Scuderia Ferrari.

Race report 

The race was lengthened from 18 to 22 laps, bringing the German Grand Prix up to the approximately 500 kilometre race distance used by the majority of Formula One Grands Prix at the time. Mercedes had brought to the Nürburgring their new open-wheeled version of the W196 for Fangio, Kling and Hermann Lang (in a one-off drive) after Mercedes's defeat at Silverstone in their streamlined cars. Hans Herrmann drove a streamlined W196s. Qualifying saw Fangio take pole position from Hawthorn, but practice was marred by the death of official Maserati driver Onofre Marimón. Going into the Wehrseifen slight right hand/sharp left hand turn, Marimón's Maserati 250F failed to negotiate the corner while going down the downhill run to the corner, plunged down an embankment, the car somersaulted. Marimón was given the last rites by a Catholic priest before dying a few minutes after rescue workers freed him. Marimón's teammate Luigi Villoresi withdrew from the race, as did the Maserati of Ken Wharton (entered by Owen Racing) but the team's third car for Sergio Mantovani made the race start. Stirling Moss qualified third in his privately entered Maserati 250F ahead of Hans Herrmann (Mercedes-Benz W196s), Gonzalez and Paul Frère (Gordini T16).

Fangio and Karl Kling led the way in their two Mercedes. Hawthorn was an early retirement with a broken axle as were Moss, Frère and privateer Maserati driver Roberto Mieres. Hermann Lang, one of the pre-war stars of the Mercedes 'silver arrows' spun out of his final Grand Prix appearance after ten laps. Gonzalez started and was running third but was so upset by Marimón's death he was called in after 16 laps to hand over to Hawthorn, who set off in pursuit of the Mercedes. He moved into second when Kling pitted and pursued Fangio relentlessly. Late in the race, drizzle forced him to slow and he held second from Trintignant. Kling finished fourth ahead of Mantovani, the last driver to travel the full race distance, getting some points for a saddened Maserati. Kling claimed the fastest lap point.

Just ten of the 23 qualifiers finished the gruelling race. With an elapsed time of 3 hours 45 minutes 45.8 seconds this was the longest (non Indy 500) F1 championship race in history, until the 2011 Canadian Grand Prix, which lasted just over four hours (but in this case it's also considered the time with race suspended). The win pushed Fangio further ahead in the championship, now to the point where he had more than double the points of his nearest rival Gonzalez. A win in the next race at the Swiss Grand Prix could wrap up his second championship.

Classification

Qualifying

Race 

Notes
 – Includes 1 point for fastest lap

Shared drive
 Car #1: González (16 laps), then Hawthorn (6 laps)

Championship standings after the race 
Drivers' Championship standings

Note: Only the top five positions are included. Only the best 5 results counted towards the Championship.

References

External links

German Grand Prix
German Grand Prix
European Grand Prix
German Grand Prix
German Grand Prix